Restrepia pandurata is a species of orchid endemic to Colombia.

References

External links 

pandurata
Endemic orchids of Colombia